Alan William "Al" Opsahl (September 27, 1924 – July 19, 1990) is an American ice hockey defenseman who competed in ice hockey at the 1948 Winter Olympics which took place in St. Moritz, Switzerland.

Opsahl was a member of the Amateur Hockey Association (AHA) and the co-captain of the American ice hockey team which played eight games at the 1948 Winter Olympics. Although the US secured a fourth-place finish, their official standing was stripped from the records due to a dispute between the United States Olympic Committee (USOC), the Ligue Internationale de Hockey sur Glace (LIHG), and the Swiss organizing committee.

References

1924 births
1990 deaths
American men's ice hockey defensemen
Ice hockey people from Minneapolis
Ice hockey players at the 1948 Winter Olympics
Olympic ice hockey players of the United States